Mary Wilombe (born 22 September 1997) is a Zambian footballer who plays as a defender for Red Arrows and the Zambia women's national team.

International career
Wilombe represented Zambia at the 2014 FIFA U-17 Women's World Cup.

References

1997 births
Living people
Zambian women's footballers
Women's association football defenders
Zambia women's international footballers
Footballers at the 2020 Summer Olympics
Olympic footballers of Zambia